Peter Sutton (23 April 1943 – 24 August 2008) was a British sound engineer. He won an Oscar for Best Sound for the film The Empire Strikes Back.

Selected filmography
 The Empire Strikes Back (1980)
 The Beatles: Get Back (2021) (original film sound recordist)

References

External links

1943 births
2008 deaths
British audio engineers
Best Sound Mixing Academy Award winners